Maréna Diombougou, often simply Maréna, is a village and commune in the Cercle of Kayes in the Kayes Region of south-western Mali. In 2009 the commune had a population of 14,905.

References

External links
.

Communes of Kayes Region